David Paquette  (born March 25, 1950 in Bridgeport, Connecticut, United States) is an American jazz pianist. He has recorded more than 53 albums. Highlights of his career include touring the European jazz circuit, establishing and directing a seventeen-year running annual Jazz Festival on New Zealand’s Waiheke Island, and years as the Musical Director for Sydney Australia's Four Seasons Hotel.

Career
Pianist, Recording Artist, Vocalist, Festival Director, Radio Host

David Paquette was born in 1950 in Bridgeport, Connecticut, USA. His parents were very active in the New Orleans revival jazz clubs of the early sixties. David would often enjoy basement rehearsals of jazz greats as they visited Connecticut for concerts, and he heard such wonderful musicians as Billie and Dede Pierce, Louis Nelson, Kid Sheik, Sammy Penn, John Handy and Kid Thomas Valentine. Inspired and surrounded by such great artists, David taught himself the basics of traditional jazz piano.

During his years at Louisiana State University David learned entertainment and vocal skills performing at Pat O’Brien’s in the French Quarter. After a year of playing ski resorts and a Chinese restaurant in Aspin, David moved to San Francisco. Here, after playing music on the streets with local buskers, he landed a job as house pianist at the Boarding House and performed as opening act for such budding pop artists as Bette Midler, Taj Mahal, The Pointer Sisters, Doctor John and comic Steve Martin.

On vacation in 1973 David discovered the pioneer Inn on the island of Maui and performed at this hotel for the next 12 years. Here his first album was produced by John McVie of Fleetwood Mac. In Hawaii David was joined by such diverse musicians as Amos Garrett, Maria Muldaur, Bonnie Raitt, Kenny Loggins, Turk Murphy and Trummy Young.

In 1983, David began to tour extensively in Europe with Sammy Rimington, Lillian Bouette and other exponents of the New Orleans jazz style. He has been featured at most of the important jazz festivals in Europe, New Zealand and Australia and has performed at several of the New Orleans Jazz and Heritage Festivals.

In 1984, David was appointed musical director of a highly acclaimed tour with Spike Milligan for three months in Australia.

David has completed a series of television commercials in New Zealand and has been traveling extensively in Indonesia, Mauritius, Greece, Scandinavia, Bulgaria and the South Pacific. He bought a home on Waiheke Island where he founded the now famous Waiheke Jazz Festival and has also performed with the Auckland Symphony Orchestra.

David now resides in Wairoa, Northern Hawkes Bay as is Patron of the Poverty Bay Blues Club, Gisborne. He continues to devote much of his time to The Paquette Jazz Foundation, a trust to support future jazz musicians around the globe.

Paquette has recorded with Bring It On Records based in Auckland, New Zealand, Art by Heart, Germany, GHB Records, New Orleans. https://open.spotify.com/artist/5fOSLyRWyhTEtBMx8UzbNq

See also
 Ascona Jazz Festival

References

External links 

 
 
 

1950 births
American jazz musicians
Musicians from Bridgeport, Connecticut
Living people
People from Waiheke Island
American emigrants to New Zealand
New Zealand jazz musicians
Jazz musicians from Connecticut